Santurce is a commune in the San Cristóbal Department, in the province of Santa Fe, Argentina.

Population
It has  inhabitants, which represents a decrease of 22% from the  the previous census.

References

Populated places in Santa Fe Province